The 1948 Preis von Ostschweiz-Erlen was a Formula One motor race held on 8 August 1948 over 50 laps of a street circuit in Erlen, Switzerland. Emmanuel de Graffenried, driving a Maserati 4CL, started from pole, set fastest lap and won the race. Rudi Fischer was second in a Simca Gordini Type 11, and Walter Wüst was third in a Cisitalia D46-Fiat.

Result

References

Suisse Orientale Grand Prix
Suisee Orientale Grand Prix